This is a list of awards and nominations received by The Prodigy.

Berlin Music Video Awards

|-
| 2015
| "Wild Frontier"
| Best Animation
|

Bravo Otto Awards 

|-
| 1993
| rowspan=2|The Prodigy
| rowspan=2|Rap & Techno (Bronze)
| 
|-
| 1994
|

Brit Awards 

|-
| 1995
| The Prodigy
| Best British Dance Act
| 
|-
| rowspan="4" | 1997
| rowspan="2" | "Firestarter"| Best British Single
| 
|-
| rowspan="2" | Best British Video
| 
|-
| "Breathe"
| 
|-
| The Prodigy
| Best British Dance Act
| 
|-
| rowspan="3" | 1998
| The Fat of the Land| MasterCard British Album
| 
|-
| rowspan="2" | The Prodigy
| Best British Group
| 
|-
| Best British Dance Act
| 
|}

 Grammy Awards 

|-
| 1998
| The Fat of the Land| Best Alternative Music Performance
| 
|-
| 2005
| Always Outnumbered, Never Outgunned| Best Electronic/Dance Album
| 
|}

Hungarian Music Awards

|-
| 1998
| The Fat of the Land| Best Foreign Album
| 
|-
| 2005
| Always Outnumbered Never Outgunned| Best Foreign Dance Album
| 

Independent Music Awards

|-
| 2012
| Themselves 
| Best Live Act 
| 

 International Dance Music Awards 

|-
| 2006
| "Voodoo People"
| Best Breaks/DnB Track 
| 
|-
| 2009
| "Omen"
| rowspan="2" | Best Dubstep/DnB/Jungle Track
| 
|-
| 2016
| "Nasty" 
|  

 Ivor Novello Awards 

|-
| 1997
| "Firestarter"
| Best Contemporary Song
| 

 Lunas del Auditorio 

|-
| 2006
| rowspan=2|Themselves
| rowspan=2|Musica Electronica
| 
|-
| 2010
| 

 MTV Video Music Awards 

|-
| rowspan="3" | 1997
| rowspan="3" | "Breathe"
| Best Dance Video
| 
|-
| Viewer's Choice
| 
|-
| International Viewer's Choice Award for MTV Europe
| 
|-
| rowspan="4" | 1998
| rowspan="4" | "Smack My Bitch Up"
| Best Dance Video
| 
|-
| Breakthrough Video
| 
|-
| Best Direction in a Vieo 
| 
|-
| Best Editing in a Vieo 
| 
|}

 MTV Europe Music Awards 

|-
| 1994
| The Prodigy
| Best Dance
| 
|-
| 1995
| Music for the Jilted Generation Tour
| Best Live Act
| 
|-
| 1996
| The Prodigy
| Best Dance
| 
|-
| rowspan="4" | 1997
| "Breathe"
| Best Video
| 
|-
| rowspan="6" | The Prodigy
| Best Group
| 
|-
| Best Dance
| 
|-
| Best Alternative
| 
|-
| 1998
| Best Dance
| 
|-
| 2004
| rowspan="2" | Best Alternative
| 
|-
| 2009
| 
|}

 MOBO Awards 

|-
| 1997
| The Prodigy 
| Best Dance Act
| 

 MVPA Awards 

|-
| rowspan="2"|1998
| rowspan="3"|"Smack My B*tch Up"
| Video of the Year
| 
|-
| Best Editing 
| 
|-
| 2007
| MVPA Hall of Fame
| 

 Mercury Prize 

|-
| 1994
| Music for the Jilted Generation 
| rowspan="2" | Album of the Year
| 
|-
| 1997
| The Fat of the Land
| 

 Music Television Awards 

|-
| rowspan=3|1994
| Music for the Jilted Generation| Best Album
| 
|-
| "No Good (Start the Dance)"
| Best Video 
| 
|-
| rowspan=8|Themselves 
| Best New Act 
| 
|-
| 1995
| rowspan=2|Best Alternative
| 
|-
| rowspan=3|1996
| 
|-
| Best Group
| 
|-
| rowspan=2|Best Dance Act
| 
|-
| rowspan=4|1997
| 
|-
| Best Group
| 
|-
| Best Alternative 
| 
|-
| "Breathe"
| rowspan=2|Best Video 
| 
|-
| rowspan=4|1998
| "Smack My Bitch Up"
| 
|-
| The Fat of the Land| Best Album
| 
|-
| rowspan=6|Themselves 
| Best Group
| 
|-
| rowspan=2|Best Dance Act 
| 
|-
| rowspan=3|2004
| 
|-
| Best Group
| 
|-
| rowspan=2|Best Alternative 
| 
|-
| 2005
| 

 NME Awards 

|-
| 1996
| rowspan="2" | The Prodigy
| rowspan="2" | Best Dance Act
| 
|-
| rowspan="2" | 1997
| 
|-
| "Firestarter" 
| Best Video
| 
|-
| rowspan="2" | 1998
| Themselves 
| Best Dance Act
| 
|-
| "Smack My Bitch Up" 
| Best Dance Single 
| 
|-
| 2013
| The Fat of the Land''
| Best Reissue 
|

Q Awards 

|-
| 1997
| rowspan="2" | The Prodigy
| rowspan="2" | Best Live Act
| 
|-
| rowspan="2" | 2009
| 
|-
| Invaders Must Die
| Best Album
|

UK Festival Awards 

|-
| 2008
| rowspan="2"|Themselves
| Festival Dance Act 
| 
|-
| 2013
| Headline Performance of the Year
|

UK Music Video Awards 

|-
| rowspan="4" | 2009
| rowspan="2" | "Warrior's Dance"
| Best Dance Video 
| 
|-
| Best Animation
| 
|-
| "Omen"
| Best Editing 
| 
|- 
| "Invaders Must Die"
| rowspan="2" | Best Live Music Coverage 
| 
|-
| 2010
| "Take Me to the Hospital" 
|

References

Awards
Lists of awards received by British musician
Lists of awards received by musical group